Nakshatra is a Hindi thriller film, directed by Mohan Savalkar and produced by Ravindra Singh. The film released on 29 October 2010 under the R Vision banner.

Synopsis

Despite high security, when a priceless diamond is stolen, the prime suspect is an aspiring screenwriter named Ajay. While writing his latest film script for some shady producers Ajay cracks the secret password for the security system. Hot on his trail is a police officer who will go to any lengths to find out if Ajay is guilty or innocent.

Plot

After his parents' demise in Delhi, aspiring scriptwriter Ajay lives in Mumbai with his parents' good friends and their daughter Jia with whom he is in love. The family is on good terms with industrialist and socialite Sharad. Ajay is frustrated as he is not able to get any good offers for his work. Luck knocks on Ajay's door when one day Sharad tells him that a group of filmmakers are interested in his work. Ajay devises an impressive script based upon the idea of a robbery given to him by the four producers - Nihal, Neha and sells it to them. Pleased with his success, Jiya agrees to marry Ajay.

Call it fortune or coincidence, Ajay's plot of the robbery matches with that of a real one in the city. He even manages to crack the Real password to the system that guards an expensive necklace called "Nakshatra" in the city museum. The Nakshatra is stolen, and the blame falls on Ajay, as the police receive information and think that he is the mastermind behind it. He gets arrested on the day of his engagement by investigating crime branch officer Gupte (Milind Soman).

On the way to the station, the police van is attacked by goons, and Ajay is set free by unknown people. Ajay is now on the run. He lands up in a farm house with a kind old vet, who takes care of him for a while, and then he proceeds incognito to the city to prove his innocence. Gupte is convinced that Ajay is the robber as he has escaped from cops, and goes about investigating the case and catch him.

Now Ajay tries to find the producers who hatched the plot n the first place. He manages to locate them but unfortunately someone would be following Ajay's steps and kills each of the four before he can get them to talk.

Cast

 Shubh Mukherjee as Ajay Kapoor
 Sabina Sheema as Jiya Khanna
 Milind Soman as Inspector Gupte
 Anupam Kher as Sharad Desai
 Anant Jog as Commissioner
 Gajendra Chauhan as Muesum Director
 Suresh Chatwal as Director
 Suhas Khandke as Col Khanna, Jiya's father
 Mahrru Shaikh as Jiya's mother
 Roshni Shetty as Astha
 Mamta Dutta as Niharika
 Jhuma Biswas as veterinary doctor

Soundtrack
The Music Was Composed By Sameer Sen, Harry Anand, Dj Sheizwood and Released by Shemaroo Entertainment Audio.

References

External links
 Official Website
 Nakshatra at Bollywood Hungama

2010 films
2010 thriller films
Hindi-language thriller films
Indian thriller films
2010s Hindi-language films